Nejc Potokar (born 2 December 1988) is a retired Slovenian footballer who played as a defender.

References

External links
NZS profile 

1988 births
Living people
People from Zagorje ob Savi
Slovenian footballers
Slovenia youth international footballers
Slovenian expatriate footballers
Association football defenders
NK Celje players
NK Triglav Kranj players
NK Maribor players
AEL Limassol players
NK Inter Zaprešić players
NK Slaven Belupo players
Sri Pahang FC players
FC Milsami Orhei players
Slovenian expatriate sportspeople in Cyprus
Expatriate footballers in Cyprus
Slovenian expatriate sportspeople in Croatia
Expatriate footballers in Croatia
Slovenian expatriate sportspeople in Malaysia
Expatriate footballers in Malaysia
Slovenian expatriate sportspeople in Moldova
Expatriate footballers in Moldova
Slovenian Second League players
Slovenian PrvaLiga players
Cypriot First Division players
First Football League (Croatia) players
Croatian Football League players
Malaysia Super League players
Moldovan Super Liga players